Cercosaura olivacea, the olive tegu, is a species of lizard in the family Gymnophthalmidae. It is found in Brazil and Argentina.

References

Cercosaura
Reptiles described in 1845